Michael Jordan (born 1963) is an American businessman and former professional basketball player.

Michael Jordan or Mike Jordan may also refer to:

People

Sports
Michael Jordan (footballer) (born 1986), English goalkeeper
Mike Jordan (basketball, born 1977), American basketball coach and former professional player
Mike Jordan (racing driver) (born 1958), English racing driver
Mike Jordan (baseball, born 1863) (1863–1940), American baseball player
Mike Jordan (cornerback) (born 1992), American football cornerback
Michael Jordan (offensive lineman) (born 1998), American football offensive lineman
Michal Jordán (born 1990), Czech ice hockey player

Other people
Michael B. Jordan (born 1987), American actor
Michael I. Jordan (born 1956), American researcher in statistics, machine learning, and artificial intelligence
Michael Jordan (insolvency baron) (born 1931), English businessman
Michael Jordan (Irish politician), Irish Farmers' Party TD from Wexford, 1927–1932
Michael H. Jordan (1936–2010), American executive for CBS, PepsiCo, Westinghouse
Michael Jordan (mycologist), English mycologist

Other uses
"Michael Jordan" (song), by rapper Kendrick Lamar featuring ScHoolboy Q on the album Overly Dedicated
Michael Jordan: An American Hero, a 1999 American TV-film based on the basketball player's story
Michael Jordan: Chaos in the Windy City, a 1994 video game featuring the basketball player

See also
Michael Jordan statue, Chicago statue of the basketball player Michael Jordan
Michael (disambiguation)
Jordan (name)